Prádlo is a municipality and village in Plzeň-South District in the Plzeň Region of the Czech Republic. It has about 200 inhabitants.

Administrative parts
The village of Novotníky is an administrative part of Prádlo.

References

Villages in Plzeň-South District